The Guinean records in swimming are the fastest ever performances of swimmers from Guinea, which are recognised and ratified by the Fédération Guinéenne de Natation et Sauvetage.

All records were set in finals unless noted otherwise.

Long Course (50 m)

Men

Women

Short Course (25 m)

Men

Women

References

Guinea
Records
Swimming